Abel Gómez Moreno (born 20 February 1982), known simply as Abel as a player, is a Spanish former professional footballer who played as a midfielder, currently manager of Recreativo de Huelva.

He totalled 351 matches and 30 goals across the two major levels of Spanish football, 102 and six being in La Liga where he represented Murcia, Xerez, Granada and Córdoba.

Gómez started working as a manager in 2019.

Playing career
Abel was born in Seville. After beginning professionally with Sevilla FC's B team, he joined Andalusian neighbours Málaga CF in the same situation, helping to a two-year Segunda División stint.

The following season, Abel signed for Real Murcia, being instrumental in their return to La Liga after a three-year absence, although they would be immediately relegated. In that summer he joined FC Steaua București, leaving after only four months. He returned to Spain and its second division with Xerez CD in late January 2009, still being able to appear in 15 games (12 starts) in the club's first-ever promotion to the top flight.

Abel contributed roughly the same numbers – although in a full season – as Xerez were immediately relegated. In late August 2010 he moved to another side in that region and tier, recently promoted Granada CF. In his debut campaign he only missed one league match in 42 (3,366 minutes of action), helping to a top-division return after an absence of 35 years.

For 2012–13, Abel returned to division two with neighbouring Córdoba CF. He scored five goals in his second season, which ended in promotion after more than four decades.

Abel earned another promotion in the 2015–16 campaign, with Segunda División B team Cádiz CF. Late into the 2017 January transfer window, the 35-year-old signed with Lorca FC.

On 31 January 2018, after helping the side to achieve a first-ever promotion to the second tier, Abel cut ties with Lorca and joined UCAM Murcia CF just hours later. In July that year, he moved across the third division to Atlético Sanluqueño CF.

Coaching career
Gómez retired in January 2019 to replace the fired Rafa Carrillo as his last club's manager. On 9 March 2020, he was dismissed after six consecutive losses. 

In March 2021, Gómez was named coach of third division side CF Rayo Majadahonda.

Career statistics

Managerial statistics

References

External links
 
 
 
 
 
 
 

1982 births
Living people
Spanish footballers
Footballers from Seville
Association football midfielders
La Liga players
Segunda División players
Segunda División B players
Sevilla Atlético players
Atlético Malagueño players
Real Murcia players
Xerez CD footballers
Granada CF footballers
Córdoba CF players
Cádiz CF players
Lorca FC players
UCAM Murcia CF players
Atlético Sanluqueño CF players
Liga I players
FC Steaua București players
Spanish expatriate footballers
Expatriate footballers in Romania
Spanish expatriate sportspeople in Romania
Spanish football managers
Segunda División B managers
Primera Federación managers
Segunda Federación managers
CF Rayo Majadahonda managers
Recreativo de Huelva managers